Sar Gach may refer to:
 Sar Gach, Andika, Khuzestan Province
 Sar Gach, Izeh, Khuzestan Province
 Sar Gach, Kohgiluyeh and Boyer-Ahmad

See also
Gach Sar